Sokhna Sy (born October 17, 1988) is a Senegalese basketball player for the Senegalese national team.

She participated at the 2017 Women's Afrobasket.

References

1988 births
Living people
Guards (basketball)
Senegalese expatriate basketball people in Belgium
Senegalese expatriate basketball people in France
Senegalese expatriate basketball people in Spain
Senegalese women's basketball players